The 2016 Tour de Yorkshire was a three-day cycling stage race took place in Yorkshire from the 29 April to the 1 May 2016, It was the second edition of the Tour de Yorkshire and was organised by Welcome to Yorkshire and the Amaury Sport Organisation. The Route was Beverley–Settle, Otley–Doncaster, and Middlesbrough–Scarborough. There was also a women's race on 30 April. The organisers had applied to British Cycling to increase the race to four days for 2016 but this application was rejected.

Teams 
18 teams were selected to take part in Tour de Yorkshire. Seven of these were UCI WorldTeams; five were UCI Professional Continental teams; five were UCI Continental teams and one was the Great Britain national team. Teams could enter between five and eight riders.

Race route 
On 9 October 2015, the start and finish locations for the event were released, these were Beverley, Doncaster, Middlesbrough, Otley, Scarborough, and Settle.

The stage routes were released on 9 December 2015.

Stages

Stage 1 
29 April — Beverley to Settle,

Stage 2 
30 April — Otley to Doncaster

Stage 3 
1 May — Middlesbrough to Scarborough

Classifications 

The race included three classifications the most important the general classification. This was calculated by adding up each cyclist's finishing times on each stage. Bonus seconds were awarded for top-three placings in each stage (10 seconds for the first rider, 6 seconds for the second, 4 seconds for the third) and for placings in intermediate sprints (3 seconds for the first rider, 2 seconds for the second, 1 second for the third). The rider with the lowest cumulative time after taking bonus seconds into account was the leader of the classification and was awarded a blue and yellow jersey. (Blue and yellow are colours traditionally associated with Yorkshire.) The winner of the general classification was considered the winner of the race.

The second classification was points classification. On each stage of the race, points were awarded to the top 10 riders. The winner won 15 points, with 12 for the second-placed rider, 9 for the third-placed rider, 7 for the sixth-placed rider and then one point fewer for each place down to tenth place. Points were also awarded to the top three riders at intermediate sprints, with five points for the winner of the sprint and three, and one points for the riders in second and third places respectively. The rider with the most points was the leader of the classification and was awarded a green jersey.

There was also a mountains classification. Over the three stages, there were 13 categorised climbs. On each of these climbs, the first four riders to the summit were awarded points, with 5 for the first rider, 3 for the second, 2 for the third and 1 for the fourth. The rider with the most accumulated points was the leader of the classification and was awarded a dark pink jersey.

Another jersey was awarded at the end of each stage. This was a combativity prize and was to be awarded to the rider who "made the greatest effort and [...] demonstrated the best qualities in terms of sportsmanship". A jury selected a list of riders to be eligible for the prize; the winner of the prize was then decided by a vote on Twitter. The rider was awarded a grey jersey.

Notes

References

Sources

External links 

 

Tour de Yorkshire
Yorkshire
Tour de Yorkshire